Whitecourt is a town in central Alberta, Canada that is surrounded by Woodlands County.

Whitecourt is also located at the confluence of four waterways – the Athabasca River, McLeod River, Sakwatamau River and Beaver Creek. A Canadian National rail line runs through the town.

The Town has branded itself as the Snowmobile Capital of Alberta and its motto is Let's Go.... The Whitecourt meteor impact crater is found on nearby Whitecourt Mountain.

History 
The community was formed in the place known by the Cree as Sagitawah (the place where the rivers meet). While the first Hudson's Bay Company trading post was established in 1897, the first permanent resident on the present day town site was John Goodwin, who settled here in 1905. In 1910, with the expansion of the Grand Trunk Pacific Railway, immigrants were encouraged by Premier Arthur Lewis Sifton to settle in the vast scarcely inhabited area between Edmonton and the Peace River Country. The name "Whitecourt" was chosen in 1910 by Walter White, the postmaster of the young community. White was the son-in-law of former Kansas governor John W. Leedy who also settled in the community.

Geography 
Whitecourt has three identifiable geographic components:
 the Valley that includes the town centre, the Athabasca Flats residential area, Millar Western's sawmill and pulp mill, and three manufactured home parks;
 the Hilltop that includes the Hilltop and Southlands Estates residential areas, the Hilltop industrial area, a 2.5 km highway commercial strip along Highway 43 and two manufactured home parks; and
 West Whitecourt, between the McLeod and Athabasca Rivers, includes an industrial area, a 1.0 km highway commercial strip along Highway 43, and a manufactured home park.

Climate 
Whitecourt has a subarctic climate (Köppen Dfc), falling just short of a humid continental climate (Dfb) due to May and September having mean average temperatures just below . Winters are long and cold (though milder than many areas farther east, even at lower latitudes), and summers are fairly short and relatively warm.

Demographics 

In the 2016 Census of Population conducted by Statistics Canada, the Town of Whitecourt recorded a population of 10,204 living in 3,743 of its 4,253 total private dwellings, a  change from its 2011 population of 9,605.

The population of the Town of Whitecourt according to its 2013 municipal census is 10,574, a 14.9% increase over its 2008 municipal census population of 9,202. At its current population, Whitecourt is one of the largest towns in the province and is eligible for city status. According to Alberta's Municipal Government Act, a town is eligible for city status when it reaches 10,000 residents.

Economy 

Whitecourt's economy is largely driven by three major industries – forestry, oil and gas industry and tourism. With some farm land to the south and east of Whitecourt, agriculture plays a minor role in the town's economy.

Whitecourt is the site of four forestry-related mills:
 Blue Ridge Lumber Sawmill / Ranger Board MDF (owned by West Fraser)
 Millar Western Pulp Mill (owned by Atlas Holdings LLC)
Canfor Sawmill
 Alberta Newsprint Company Pulp & Paper Mill.

Due to Whitecourt and area's forestry heritage, the Canadian Forestry Association named Whitecourt and Woodlands County the "Forest Capital of Canada 2013".

Whitecourt is also home to many service companies in the oil and gas industry.

Attractions 

Attractions within Whitecourt include the Allan & Jean Millar Centre, Rotary Park, the Forest Interpretive Centre and Heritage Park, and a variety of other facilities and parks.

The Allan & Jean Millar Centre consists of both an aquatic facility, a fieldhouse, a fitness facility, a children's indoor playground area, and boardroom and classroom rental spaces. The aquatic facility comprises a main pool, a children's pool, a leisure pool, a lazy river, a water slide, a hot tub, and a steam room. The fieldhouse includes a configurable multi-sport area, a track, and racquetball and squash courts. The fitness centre provides cardio training equipment, weight training equipment, and a fitness studio. Overall, this recreation venue also provides a variety of programming including lessons, classes, and personal training.

Rotary Park, located in the river valley adjacent to downtown, is a multi-use outdoor park facility consisting of a pond stocked with fish that is cleared for skating in the winter, trails, sports fields, playgrounds, picnic areas, an off-leash dog park, and a river slide attraction featuring two flowing artificial creeks with drops for tubing. A splash park with 19 water features opened within Rotary Park in 2012.

The town also features several bike trails, as well as a professionally designed bike park.

The Forest Interpretive Centre includes a multi-media museum that presents the forestry industry's role in Whitecourt's history. It also features meeting rooms and hosts the local chamber of commerce, a tourist information centre, and town council meetings. The Forest Interpretive Centre's associated Heritage Park includes antique vehicles and farm equipment, a barn, and an interpretive trail among other features.

Sports 

Travis Roche and Rocky Thompson are current and former professional hockey players that were raised in Whitecourt. Roche played 60 games in the National Hockey League (NHL) between the Minnesota Wild and Phoenix Coyotes and now plays for SC Bern in Switzerland's National League A. He has represented Team Canada at the Spengler Cup on numerous occasions, winning gold at the 2012 tournament. Thompson played 25 games in the NHL between the Calgary Flames and Florida Panthers and was an assistant coach for the Edmonton Oilers in the National Hockey League.

Normand Lacombe is the strength and conditioning coach for the Whitecourt Wolverines of the Alberta Junior Hockey League (AJHL), and was the head coach of the predecessor Wolverines of the North West Junior Hockey League prior to the AJHL's arrival. Lacombe played 319 games in the NHL for the Buffalo Sabres, Edmonton Oilers and Philadelphia Flyers, winning the Stanley Cup with the Oilers in 1988.

Government 

Whitecourt Town Council consists of a mayor and six councillors that were elected in the 2017 municipal election. The current members of town council are Mayor Maryann Chichak and councillors Paul Chauvet, Matt Connell, Ray Hilts, Bill McAree, Tom Pickard, and Derek Schlosser. The town's chief administrative officer is Peter Smyl.

The Northern Gateway Public Schools division office is located in Whitecourt. The school division is responsible for public schools within the geography comprising Lac Ste. Anne County and portions of Woodlands County and the Municipal District of Greenview No. 16, including the towns of Fox Creek, Mayerthorpe, Onoway and Valleyview in addition to Whitecourt.

Whitecourt is located within the Whitecourt-Ste. Anne provincial electoral district, which is represented by Oneil Carlier of the Alberta New Democratic Party. Progressive Conservative George VanderBurg was a four-term MLA for the district until 2015. A resident of Whitecourt, VanderBurg was a businessman and the mayor of the town for nine years prior to his entry into provincial politics.

At the federal level, Whitecourt is located within the Yellowhead electoral district, which is represented by Conservative Jim Eglinski. Conservative Rob Merrifield was a four-term MP for the district until 2014. Merrifield is a resident of Whitecourt and a farmer. In the next federal election, Whitecourt will be part of the newly formed riding of Peace River—Westlock.

Other former politicians who lived in Whitecourt include Raj Pannu, Allen Sulatycky and Rod Fox. Pannu, former MLA for Edmonton-Strathcona and former leader of the Alberta New Democratic Party, taught high school in Whitecourt between 1962 and 1964. Sulatycky, judge and former MP for Rocky Mountain, was a lawyer and was elected the first Liberal to represent Whitecourt's constituency in 1968. Fox, former Wildrose Party MLA for Lacombe-Ponoka, was born and raised in Whitecourt.

Infrastructure

Health care 

Acute and non-acute medical care is provided at the Whitecourt Healthcare Centre.

Transportation 
Air
It is Alberta's ninth busiest airport with up to 32,000 aircraft using the airport annually. Numerous carriers offer scheduled charter flights out of the airport.

Bus
Red Arrow and Northern Express offer service to Edmonton and Grande Prairie.

Rail
The CN Sangudo Subdivision provides rail service through Whitecourt from Edmonton to numerous gas plants south of Fox Creek. The Millar Western Sawmill / Pulp Mill and the Alberta Newsprint Company Pulp & Paper Mill are both served by rail.

Roads
The Town of Whitecourt is served by two highways. Highway 43, which is part of the CANAMEX Corridor, is a twinned highway that provides connection to Edmonton to the southeast and Grande Prairie to the northwest.

Highway 32 provides Whitecourt with a direct link to the Yellowhead Highway (Highway 16) to the south, which connects the town to Edson and Hinton to the southwest.

Numerous local roads provide connections from Whitecourt to surrounding rural areas within Woodlands County. Within the McLeod River valley, Govenlock Road feeds two rural roads – West Mountain Road (Range Road 122) and Tower Road (Range Road 121A) – that provide access to numerous country residential subdivisions and some agricultural operations to the south.

Within the Athabasca River valley, Flats Road (Township Road 600), which exits the town following its northern boundary, serves numerous agricultural operations to the east.

On the Hilltop, 41 Avenue (Township Road 594A), which was the original highway alignment into Whitecourt, exits the town eastbound for the Hamlet of Blue Ridge. This road is commonly referred to as Blue Ridge Road.

Education 

Northern Gateway Regional Division No. 10
 Central Elementary School (3-5)
 Pat Hardy Elementary School (K-2)
 Percy Baxter Middle School (6-8)
 Hilltop Jr/Sr High School (9-12)

Living Waters Catholic Regional Division No. 42
 St. Mary's School (K-3)
 St. Joseph School (4-12)

Media 
Newspapers
Whitecourt is served by two weekly papers, the Sun Media owned Whitecourt Star, the independent Whitecourt Press, and the monthly Community Advisor.

Radio
Two FM radio stations broadcast from Whitecourt. 'Boom 96.7 (FM 96.7, CFXW-FM) and XM 105'' (FM 105.3, CIXM-FM) broadcast classic hits and contemporary country formats respectively.

Sister cities 
Whitecourt has been twinned with Yūbetsu, Hokkaido, Japan, since 1998.

See also 
List of communities in Alberta
List of towns in Alberta

References

External links 

 
1959 establishments in Alberta
Towns in Alberta
Former new towns in Alberta